The Admirer is a 2012 Russian drama film directed by Vitaliy Melnikov.

Plot 
The film tells about the relationship of the seriously ill Anton Chekhov with the married writer Lydia Avilova.

Cast 
 Kirill Pirogov		
 Svetlana Ivanova
 Oleg Andreyev
 Aleksandr Adabashyan
 Ivan Krasko
 Svetlana Kryuchkova		
 Dmitri Lunev
 Oksana Mysina
 Oleg Tabakov
 Artem Yakovlev
 Mariya Zhilchenko

References

External links 
 

2012 films
Anton Chekhov
2010s Russian-language films
Russian drama films
2012 drama films